False Advertising may refer to:

 False advertising, use of deliberately false statements or deception in advertising
 False Advertising (song), on Lifted or The Story Is in the Soil, Keep Your Ear to the Ground, the fourth album by Bright Eyes
 False Advertising (band), an alternative rock group from England